The Wallersheim Formation is a geologic formation in Germany. It preserves fossils dating back to the Devonian period.

See also

 List of fossiliferous stratigraphic units in Germany

References
 

Geologic formations of Germany
Devonian System of Europe
Devonian Germany
Devonian southern paleotropical deposits